Euphorbia grandialata is a species of flowering plant in the family Euphorbiaceae. It is endemic to South Africa in the Northern Cape. It was named by Robert Allen Dyer, in 1937.

Eytomology 
Euphorbia is generic name that derives from the Greek physician of King Juba II of Mauritania, Euphorbus, in allusion to his large belly, since he used Euphorbia resinifera medically. In 1753 Carlos Linnaeus assigned the name to the entire genus. 

Grandialata is a Latin epithet meaning "with large wings".

References

External links 

grandialata
Flora of South Africa